The Museo etnologico delle Apuane (Ethnological Museum) is an anthropological and ethnographical museum of the Apuan Alps, located in Massa, Tuscany, Italy.

References 
Site of Brunelleschi IMSS on Museo etnologico delle Apuane

Etnologico Apuane
Museums in Tuscany
Culture of Tuscany